The Yusuf Hamied Department of Chemistry is the University of Cambridge's chemistry department. It was formed from a merger in the early 1980s of two separate departments that had moved into the Lensfield Road building decades earlier: the Department of Physical Chemistry (originally led by Professor Ronald Norrish FRS, Nobel Laureate; the department was previously located near the Old Cavendish in Free School Lane - see photo) and the Department of Chemistry (that included theoretical chemistry and which was led by Lord (Alexander) Todd FRS, Nobel Laureate) respectively. Research interests in the department cover a broad of chemistry ranging from molecular biology to geophysics. The department is located on the Lensfield Road, next to the Panton Arms on the South side of Cambridge. In December 2020, it was renamed for 30 years in recognition of a donation from Dr Yusuf Hamied, an alumnus of the department.

Research
The Department's research is organised around five Research Interest Groups (RIGs):

 Biological Chemistry
 Materials Chemistry
 Physical and Atmospheric Chemistry
 Synthetic Chemistry
 Theory

In addition, the Chemistry of Health Building houses the Centre for Misfolding Diseases, the Chemistry of Health Incubator and the Molecular Production and Characterisation Centre (MPACC).

References

External links

Chemistry, Department of